Girolamo Borghese, O.S.B. (11 January 1616 – 15 January 1698) was a Roman Catholic prelate who served as Bishop of Pienza (1668–1698)
and Bishop of Sovana (1652–1668).

Biography
Girolamo Borghese was born in Siena, Italy on 11 January 1616 and ordained a priest in the Order of Saint Benedict.
On 11 December 1652, he was appointed Bishop of Sovana by Pope Innocent X.
On 29 December 1652, he was consecrated bishop by Marcantonio Franciotti, Cardinal-Priest of Santa Maria della Pace, with Ranuccio Scotti Douglas, Bishop Emeritus of Borgo San Donnino, serving as co-consecrators. 
On 17 December 1668, he was transferred to the diocese of Pienza by Pope Clement IX.

He served as Bishop of Pienza until his death on 15 January 1698.

References

External links and additional sources
 (for Chronology of Bishops) 
 (for Chronology of Bishops) 
 (for Chronology of Bishops) 
 (for Chronology of Bishops) 

17th-century Italian Roman Catholic bishops
Bishops appointed by Pope Innocent X
Bishops appointed by Pope Clement IX
1616 births
1698 deaths
People from Siena
Benedictine bishops
Bishops of Pienza